Brian A. Cutillo (1945–2006) was a scholar and translator in the field of Tibetan Buddhism. He was also an accomplished neuro-cognitive scientist, musician, anthropologist and textile weaver.

Studies at MIT

Cutillo was a graduate of the Massachusetts Institute of Technology majoring in physics (1967).

While at MIT, Brian wrote the music for An Evening of One Act Plays presented October 14–15, 1966:

At the Hawk’s Well -- By William Butler Yeats; Directed by Ralph Sawyer ’67; Music - Brian Cutillo ’67

Brian provided the cultural background and translations for the recording "The
Music of Tibet". The recordings were made by Prof. Huston Smith, then Professor
of Philosophy at MIT, in 1964. Dr. Smith provided an interpretation. The recording
was reviewed in the journal Ethnomusicology in 1972.

Studies with Geshe Wangyal

Brian Cutillo was introduced to Ngawang Wangyal while a student at MIT. He became one of his earliest American students. Ngawang Wangyal wrote the book The Door of Liberation published by Maurice Girodias Associates, Inc., (1973). Among the Acknowledgments in the original edition are:

Ngawang Wangyal and Brian Cutillo also translated the Illuminations of Sakya Pandita.
From the rear book cover:
Like a blind man finding a jewel
In a heap of garbage.
Through what good fortune
Was this Illumination born in me.

Cutillo writes in the Preface to Illuminations:

Milarepa translations
Cutillo's best known work includes two books of Milarepa poems translated with Kunga Rinpoche, Drinking the Mountain Stream and Miraculous Journey.
 When starting the Lotsawa publishing company to publish these two collections of beloved songs, against impossible odds, Cutillo was also instrumental in publishing important works by H.V. Guenther (The Creative Vision) and Longchenpa (You Are the Eyes of the World).

The Turquoise Bee

With the late Rick Fields, Cutillo translated The Turquoise Bee. These were the love songs of the 6th Dalai Lama. The book page shows Ume calligraphy by Brian Cutillo and a drawing by Mayumi Oda.

Scholarly Tibetan Buddhism translations

Brian translated scholarly Tibetan Buddhism Abhidharma texts that remained
unpublished at his death.

Some of these translations are now being completed for publication under the
auspices, among others, of the Infinity Foundation. They were started some 35 years
ago in collaboration with Dr. Robert Thurman.

"...The following texts in rough draft form needing further work for publication in the mid-future: ... Abhidharma-samuccaya by Asanga (Thurman and Cutillo); Samdhinirmocana-sutra (Thurman and Cutillo) ..."

Research in human cognitive neuroscience

Brian Cutillo worked with his MIT classmate, Dr. Alan Gevins, in the
early days of the EEG Systems Lab in San Francisco. Cutillo co-authored
with Dr. Gevins, and others, numerous scientific research papers
including 3 papers published in Science, the Journal of the American
Association for the Advancement of Science. Along with a paper from the
EEG Systems Lab in Science in 1979, these 3 papers helped usher in the
modern era of cognitive neuroscience by reporting advanced computerized
methods of measuring the electrical signals in the human brain
reflecting fundamental cognitive processes of attention.
 Gevins, A.S., Morgan, N.H., Bressler, S.L., Cutillo, B.A., White, R.M., Illes, J., Greer, D.S., Doyle, J.C. & Zeitlin, G.M. (1987).  Human neuroelectric patterns predict performance accuracy. Science, 235, 580–585.
 Gevins, A.S., Schaffer, R.E., Doyle, J.C., Cutillo, B.A., Tannehill, R.L. & Bressler, S.L. (1983). Shadows of thought: Shifting lateralization of human brain electrical patterns during brief visuomotor task. Science, 220, 97–99.
 Gevins, A.S., Doyle, J.C., Cutillo, B.A., Schaffer, R.E., Tannehill, R.S., Ghannam, J.H., Gilcrease, V.A. & Yeager, C.L. (1981). Electrical potentials in human brain during cognition: New method reveals dynamic patterns of correlation. Science, 213, 918–922.

With the Hopi community in Arizona

Cutillo was a key figure, initially as a Tibetan language translator, in the
interplay between the Hopi Indian community and Tibetan Buddhist monks who were
born in Tibetan speaking regions.

Cutillo's association with the Hopi community is documented in a radio recording
with James Koots A Hopi Plea. The recording is available from New Dimensions
Media as Program #1613. From the New Dimensions Website review:

"(James) Koots, designated messenger of the Hopi Elders, tells of the threat to the centuries-old tradition of the Hopi. Modern technology, unwanted government gifts and misdirected aid programs are taking their toll on the Hopi culture. In a personal and poignant way Koots shares the Hopi love of the Earth. He is joined by (Brian) Cutillo, a Buddhist scholar who has befriended the Hopi in their quest to preserve their ancient ways."

Textile endeavors
Brian Cutillo wove textiles on a manual floor loom based on early American heirloom patterns. Many of those weavings, including those in the photographs, are in private collections.

Obituary

Brian Cutillo died January 4, 2006 in Tulare, CA. His obituary (January 10, 2006)
in the Tulare Advance-Register read:

"Brian A. Cutillo, 60, of Tulare died Wednesday, Jan. 4, 2006. He was a scientist and an author. Funeral arrangements..."

References

Bibliography
 
 

1945 births
2006 deaths
Buddhist translators
American cognitive scientists
Tibetan Buddhism writers
Tibetan Buddhists from the United States
20th-century translators
MIT Department of Physics alumni